Marcin Brosz (born 11 April 1973) is a Polish retired footballer who played as a midfielder, and is the current manager of the Poland under-19 national team.

As a player, he spent his career playing for clubs in Poland. In 2005, he turned to coaching, becoming the manager of Polonia Bytom, Koszarawa Żywiec, Podbeskidzie Bielsko-Biała, Odra Wodzisław and Piast Gliwice. After that, he became the manager of Górnik Zabrze, performing his duties until 27 May 2021.

References

External links
 

1973 births
Living people
People from Knurów
Sportspeople from Silesian Voivodeship
Polish footballers
Szombierki Bytom players
Górnik Zabrze players
GKS Bełchatów players
Polonia Bytom players
Polish football managers
Polonia Bytom managers
Podbeskidzie Bielsko-Biała managers
Odra Wodzisław Śląski managers
Piast Gliwice managers
Korona Kielce managers
Górnik Zabrze managers
Association football midfielders